Adonai Enlil "AD" Mitchell (born October 8, 2002) is an American football wide receiver for the Texas Longhorns. He previously played for Georgia.

High school career 
Mitchell was born on October 8, 2002 to Darcy and Norman Mitchell in Missouri City, Texas. Mitchell has three siblings, Ariel Mitchell, Amenofis Mitchell and Anshar Mitchell. He also has one daughter, Icylinn McLaurine.

He attended Cane Ridge High School in Antioch, Tennessee. During his high school career, he had 53 receptions for 795 yards, 8 receiving touchdowns, 373 rushing yards, and 9 rushing touchdowns on 68 attempts.

Mitchell is notable for being named the 2019 Tennesseean Region 5-6A Athlete of the Year following a season which saw him record 28 receptions for 417 yards and 5 touchdowns in addition to 203 rushing yards and 4 touchdowns on 45 carries, leading his team to a 9-4 overall record and a 6-0 league record. Before the start of the 2020 high school season, he was named to the MaxPreps Preseason Tennessee All-State Second Team Offense.

Prior to his time at Cane Ridge High School, Mitchell attended Ridge Point High School in Missouri City, Texas where he had 25 receptions totaling 378 yards and 3 touchdowns in addition to 170 rushing yards and 5 touchdowns on 23 carries. Following the season, he was named to the UIL Class 6A District 20 All-District Second Team Offense.

College career

Georgia 
Mitchell, who was a three-star recruit and the #64 wide receiver prospect in his class by  247sports.com began his career at UGA in September 2021. He enrolled at the University of Georgia in January 2021 after flipping his commitment from Ole Miss in July 2020. This came following his recruitment by top-ranked football programs such as Auburn, Missouri, West Virginia, and Boston College, among others. In the Georgia Bulldogs' spring game in April 2021, he caught 7 of his 13 targets for 105 yards and 1 touchdown, garnering praise from head coach Kirby Smart and attention from his starting quarterback, JT Daniels. During week three of the 2021 Georgia Bulldogs season, Mitchell was named SEC Freshman of the Week following a performance that saw him record four receptions for 77 yards and one touchdown vs South Carolina. 

He was a key part of the 2022 College Football National Championship victory, catching the go-ahead 40-yard touchdown pass from Stetson Bennett with 8 minutes remaining. During the celebration of the victory, Mitchell was interviewed by CBS Atlanta affiliate, WGCL, where he recounted the catch, "It was amazing to answer that call when it came, be that answer that the team needed to come through."

Mitchell finished the season as the Bulldogs' third ranked receiver, totalling 27 receptions for 376 yards and 3 touchdowns.

He was coached by Cortez Hankton, then the passing game coordinator and wide receivers coach at Georgia. Hankton was replaced by Bryan McClendon in 2022.

Texas 
On January 20, 2023, Mitchell transferred to Texas.

Statistics

Personal life
Mitchell has Type 1 diabetes.

References

Further reading

2002 births
Living people
Players of American football from Texas
American football wide receivers
Georgia Bulldogs football players